Jennifer Nierva born (November 8, 1999) is a Filipina volleyball player. She currently plays for NU Lady Bulldogs in the UAAP.

Volleyball career 

Nierva joined the NU Lady Bulldogs in 2019 and she plays as the Libero of the team.

In 2022, she won the Best Libero Award in the UAAP Season 84 volleyball tournaments and her team National University won the title after 65 years.

Jen Nierva, and her team mates Princess Robles, Ivy Lacsina, and Joyme Cagande will make their final appearance in the UAAP Season 85.

Clubs 

 NU Lady Bulldogs - (2018-present)

Awards

Individuals 
 Best Libero - UAAP Season 84 volleyball tournaments

Collegiate 
  2022 Champions - UAAP Season 84 volleyball tournaments with (NU Lady Bulldogs)

References 

Filipino women's volleyball players
Living people
1999 births
Liberos